Cryptandra micrantha is a flowering plant in the family Rhamnaceae and is endemic to the southwest of Western Australia. It is a prostrate or upright shrub with spiny branchlets, narrowly oblong to elliptic leaves and dense clusters of white or cream-coloured, tube-shaped flowers.

Description
The edges of the leaves are turned down or rolled under, sometimes concealing the lower surface. Flowering occurs from April to August.

Taxonomy and naming
Cryptandra micrantha was first formally described in 2007 by Barbara Lynette Rye in the journal Nuytsia from specimens collected near Mount Gibson in 1994. The specific epithet (micrantha ) means "small flower".

Distribution
This cryptandra grows in stony places, often on hills and occurs between Canna, Wongan Hills, Boorabbin and Mount Magnet in the Avon Wheatbelt, Coolgardie, Jarrah Forest, Mallee, Murchison and Yalgoo  bioregions of south-western Western Australia.

Conservation status
Cryptandra micrantha is listed as "not threatened" by the Western Australian Government Department of Biodiversity, Conservation and Attractions.

References

micrantha
Rosales of Australia
Flora of Western Australia
Plants described in 2007
Taxa named by Barbara Lynette Rye